Godwin Emeh is a Nigerian former professional tennis player.

Emeh, a native of Lagos, didn't take up tennis until the age of 13. He attended Hampton Institute (now Hampton University) in Virginia on a scholarship and earned All-American honors while competing in the NCAA Division II. 

On the professional tour, Emeh was a top 500 player in both singles and doubles. He featured in the qualifying draw at the Wimbledon Championships and made the quarter-finals of a Lagos Challenger in 1987.

References

External links
 
 

Year of birth missing (living people)
Living people
Nigerian male tennis players
African Games medalists in tennis
African Games silver medalists for Nigeria
Competitors at the 1987 All-Africa Games
Sportspeople from Lagos
Hampton Pirates tennis players
20th-century Nigerian people